Turtle Creek Stadium (formerly Pit Spitters Park and Wuerfel Park) is a 4,660-seat multi-use entertainment facility in Blair Township, Michigan, in the United States that hosted its first regular season baseball game on May 24, 2006, as the tenants of the facility, the Traverse City Beach Bums, took on the Kalamazoo Kings. It was built as a new home of the Beach Bums baseball team, the first in Traverse City in 93 years. In 2018, the Wuerfel's retired and the park sold. In 2019, Wuerfel Park became home to Traverse City's new baseball team, the Traverse City Pit Spitters of the summer collegiate Northwoods League.

History 
The groundbreaking for Wuerfel Park took place in late 2004 and was completed in time for the Beach Bums' inaugural 2006 season. The ballpark's façade resembles that of a resort hotel, a feature unique to baseball stadium architecture. John and Leslye Wuerfel (the namesakes of the ballpark), owners of Wuerfel Resorts and of the Beach Bums, designed Wuerfel Park to reference the region's resort industry and to their own type of business.

In 2018, the Traverse City Beach Bums and Weurfel Park were sold to a new ownership group led by the CEO of the West Michigan Whitecaps in Grand Rapids, Michigan.. A new team, the Traverse City Pit Spitters, began playing at the park beginning in 2019, with the name changed to Pit Spitters Park with the sale.

In 2019, nearby Turtle Creek Casino  purchased the naming rights for the park, changing the name to   "Turtle Creek Stadium" for the 2020 season.

References

Sports venues completed in 2006
Baseball venues in Michigan
Minor league baseball venues
High school baseball venues in the United States
Sports in Traverse City, Michigan
Buildings and structures in Grand Traverse County, Michigan
Tourist attractions in Grand Traverse County, Michigan